Edward Acton (died 1707) was a captain in the Royal Navy, distinguished for services in the reign of Queen Anne.

Life
Acton was born in about 1673, the illegitimate son of Mary Acton (née Weaver), widow of William Acton of Buildwas, Shropshire (son of Sir Edward Acton, 1st Baronet).

In 1703 Acton had Captain Richard Kirkby and Captain Cooper Wade as prisoners as he escorted them back to England to be executed. They had been found guilty of failing to support Vice-Admiral John Benbow.

In Sir George Rooke's vigorous and intrepid attack of Gibraltar, he commanded , one of the ships at the Capture of Gibraltar.

Under the same chief, Acton took part in the Battle of Málaga (1704); but aspersions had been cast upon his bravery. Fortunately, however, for Acton, and others who underwent the same ordeal, a court martial silenced slander and exposed the fabrications. He was fully and honourably acquitted.

Whilst part of a larger battle and while escorting other ships his ship was engaged by two French ships under the command of Claude de Forbin off Dungeness. Acton was killed.

References

1707 deaths
Royal Navy officers
British naval commanders in the War of the Spanish Succession
Year of birth missing